John Berner (born February 14, 1991) is an American professional soccer player who is currently the goalkeeping coach for Huntsville City of MLS Next Pro.

Career
Born in St. Louis, Missouri, after playing for four years with the SIU Edwardsville Cougars, Berner was selected as the 35th overall pick in the 2014 MLS SuperDraft by the Colorado Rapids. He then made his professional debut for the Rapids in Major League Soccer on March 15, 2014 against the New York Red Bulls at Red Bull Arena.

In January 2020, Berner signed with his hometown club, Saint Louis FC of the USL Championship. Saint Louis FC folded following the 2020 USL Championship season.

In March 2021, Berner joined Memphis 901 FC ahead of the 2021 season. Berner played every minute in goal for Memphis until a ruptured right Achilles tendon ended his season in June. Berner was re-signed by Memphis on January 19, 2022.

On January 18, 2023, Berner joined MLS Next Pro expansion club Huntsville City as their first-ever goalkeeping coach.

Career statistics

References

External links 
 

1991 births
Living people
American soccer players
SIU Edwardsville Cougars men's soccer players
St. Louis Lions players
Colorado Rapids players
Charlotte Independence players
Phoenix Rising FC players
Association football goalkeepers
Soccer players from St. Louis
Colorado Rapids draft picks
USL League Two players
Major League Soccer players
USL Championship players
Saint Louis FC players
OKC Energy FC players
Memphis 901 FC players
Nashville SC non-playing staff
Association football goalkeeping coaches